Alcithoe flemingi is a species of large sea snail, a marine gastropod mollusc in the family Volutidae, the volutes.

Habitat
This volute  is endemic to New Zealand and lives in deep water off the Chatham Rise, off Auckland and the Campbell Islands

References
 
 

Volutidae
Gastropods of New Zealand
Gastropods described in 1978